As Good as Married is a 1937 American comedy film directed by Edward Buzzell and starring John Boles,  Doris Nolan and Walter Pidgeon. The film was distributed by Universal Pictures. Filming started in December 1936.

Synopsis
In order to avoid a large tax bill, a boss marries his secretary and ends up falling in love with her.

Cast
John Boles as Alexander Drew
Doris Nolan as Sylvia Parker
Walter Pidgeon as Fraser James
Tala Birell as Princess Cherry Bouladoff
Alan Mowbray as Wally
Katharine Alexander as Alma Burnside
 Esther Ralston as 	Miss Danforth
 Ernest Cossart as Quinn
 Mary Philips as Laura
 Dorothea Kent as Poochie
 David Oliver as Ernie
 Harry Davenport as Jessup
 Billy Kent Schaefer as 	Page
 Elsa Christiansen as Jean Stafford
 Rita Gould as Saleslady

References

External links
 
 

American comedy films
American black-and-white films
1937 comedy films
1937 films
Universal Pictures films
Films scored by David Raksin
Films with screenplays by F. Hugh Herbert
1930s English-language films
Films directed by Edward Buzzell
1930s American films